Frederick Braue [pronounced BROW-ee] (March 9, 1906 – July 3, 1962) was an American journalist notable for his contribution to the field of card magic. He was a semi-professional magician, specializing in card magic, of which he was a master.

Braue co-authored several books with Jean Hugard, including Expert Card Technique and Royal Road to Card Magic. As Braue and Hugard lived on opposite sides of the America, they wrote their books via correspondence.

In the 1940s, Frederick Braue edited a children's page, called Aunt Elsie's Page, for the Oakland Tribune newspaper.

Frederick Braue contributed to many magazines including a column in Hugard's Magic Monthly, which he edited from 1959 to 1962. He also invented numerous card sleights and effects including:
 Braue Reversal which is a method for reversing a card in the deck in the course of a cutting action.
 Braue Addition
 Rear Palm (in 1935)
 Homing Card

Published works
In collaboration with Jean Hugard:
 Expert Card Technique (1940)
 Miracle Methods N° 1 : Stripper Deck (1941)
 Miracle methods N° 2 : Gambling (1942)
 Miracle Methods N° 3 : Prepared Cards (1942)
 Miracle Methods N° 4 : Tricks and Sleights (1943)
 The Invisible Pass (1946)
 Showtoppers with Cards (1948)
 Royal Road to Card Magic (1949)
 Fred Braue On False Deals (1978)

References

External links
 
 Frederick Braue (Open Library)

American magicians
1906 births
1962 deaths
Sleight of hand
Card magic
American male journalists
20th-century American journalists
Writers from the San Francisco Bay Area
20th-century American writers
20th-century American male writers